Nouga Georges (born June 22, 1987) is a Cameroonian footballer currently playing for Castanhal.

References

1987 births
Living people
Cameroonian footballers
Cameroonian expatriate footballers
Sport Club do Recife players
Associação Portuguesa de Desportos players
Sportivo Luqueño players
Expatriate footballers in Brazil
Expatriate footballers in Paraguay
Association football defenders